Hagens Berman–Supermint was a professional UCI women's cycling team, based in the United States, which competes in elite women's road bicycle racing events. After  disbanded at the end of 2015, a number of key riders moved across to the team. The team is co-owned by directeur sportif Jono Coulter and rider Lindsay Goldman.

Team roster

Major results
2018
 Overall Tucson Bicycle Classic, Jennifer Luebke
Stage 1 (ITT), Jennifer Luebke
 Sprints classification Redlands Bicycle Classic, Jessica Cerra
 Mountain classification, Starla Teddergreen
Stage 4, Jessica Cerra
Sunny King Criterium, Lily Williams
 Combativity award Tour of California Stage 1, Whitney Allison
 Combativity award Tour of California Stage 2, Lily Williams
Winston-Salem Cycling Classic, Lily Williams
2019
Winston-Salem Cycling Classic, Leigh Ann Ganzar

National champions
2016
 Japan Time Trial, Eri Yonamine
 Japan Road Race, Eri Yonamine

2017
 Australia Cyclo-cross, Peta Mullens

References

External links

UCI Women's Teams
Cycling teams based in the United States
Women's sports teams in the United States
Cycling teams established in 2016
2016 establishments in the United States